Jamiroquai – Live at Montreux 2003 is a DVD/Blu-ray of a concert performed by the British band Jamiroquai at the 2003 Montreux Jazz Festival. The DVD was released on 1 October 2007 through Eagle Vision, a distributor also related to other DVD releases of Montreux Jazz Festival performances, and the same distributor later published the HD Blu-ray version on 4 August 2009.

While the concert had previously been bootlegged in whole by fans, this disc is the first official release of the concert's recording. While the DVD and Blu-ray features all of the tracks from the festival (including the notoriously rare "Shoot the Moon"), it also features a 12-minute live version of "Space Cowboy", recorded at the same jazz festival, albeit in 1995.

Most of this concert's songs are extended, a prime example being "Travelling Without Moving", which lasts for 3 minutes and 40 seconds on the album but 12 minutes during the concert. Such extended performances are common for the band's live concerts.

Track listing 

All tracks recorded at the 2003 Montreux jazz festival unless otherwise noted.

 Use the Force
 Canned Heat
 Cosmic Girl
 Little L
 Blow Your Mind
 High Times
 Travelling Without Moving
 Butterfly
 Shoot the Moon
 Soul Education
 Just Another Story
 Mr Moon
 Alright
 Love Foolosophy
 Deeper Underground
 Space Cowboy (Recorded on 12 July 1995 at the Montreux Music & Convention Centre during the 1995 Montreux Jazz Festival)

Personnel

Jason Kay – vocals
Matt Johnson – keyboards
Rob Harris – guitar
Nick Fyffe – bass
Derrick McKenzie – drums
Sola Akingbola – percussion, backing vocals
Hazel Fernandez – backing vocals
Lorraine McIntosh – backing vocals

Charts

References

All references taken from Funkin.com.

Jamiroquai live albums
Albums recorded at the Montreux Jazz Festival
2007 live albums
Jamiroquai video albums